Garry Kitchen (born August 18, 1955, in Washington, D.C., United States) is a video game designer, programmer, and executive best known for developing games for the Atari 2600, Commodore 64, Nintendo Entertainment System, and Super Nintendo Entertainment System, as well as co-founding Absolute Entertainment with ex-Activision developers.  His port of Donkey Kong for the Atari 2600 was a major hit for Coleco, selling over  copies. His other 2600 work includes Keystone Kapers and Pressure Cooker for Activision and Space Jockey for U.S. Games. He also wrote Garry Kitchen's GameMaker and The Designer's Pencil for the Commodore 64.

Career
Kitchen received a B.S. in Electrical Engineering from Fairleigh Dickinson University in Teaneck, NJ (1980). Before his video game career, Kitchen developed electronic toys at Wickstead Design Associates, in Cedar Knolls, New Jersey. In 1979, Kitchen was an engineer on Wildfire, a handheld electronic game distributed by Parker Brothers. After Wildfire, in 1982, Kitchen co-invented the handheld electronic game Bank Shot, a pool simulation also distributed by Parker Brothers. Bank Shot was named one of the Ten Best Toys of 1980 by OMNI Magazine. Kitchen was awarded U.S. Patent #4,346,982 "Electronic Pool Game", for Bank Shot.

Kitchen was president and CEO of Absolute Entertainment from 1986 to 1995. In 1995, Kitchen and his longtime business partner David Crane founded Skyworks Technologies, an early internet game company which created Candystand.com and pioneered the category of online advergames. Kitchen and Crane sold the controlling interest in Skyworks in 2007 and left the company in September 2009.

From 2010 to 2012, Kitchen was the Vice President of Game Publishing for Viacom Media Networks, working in the Nickelodeon Kids and Family Games Group. In that role he was responsible for game content on AddictingGames.com and Shockwave.com, at the time two of the largest U.S.-based online game sites. In 2012, Kitchen and his team at Viacom launched the AddictingGames Mobile App for the Apple iPhone, which went to #1 in the Apple App store in 72 hours. The AddictingGames Mobile App was nominated for a 2012 Webby Award in the category of Games (Handheld Devices).

Garry Kitchen currently (2012–present) works as an independent technical expert in legal matters concerning video game and mobile app design and development, patent infringement & invalidity, copyright infringement, general software development, video game industry history and business issues. Kitchen has performed Expert Witness consulting for clients such as Nintendo, Sony Interactive Entertainment and Ubisoft.

Garry Kitchen, along with his brother Dan Kitchen and David Crane, founded Audacity Games in November 2020 to develop Atari 2600 games to be played on retro consoles. They plan to release these games as both physical copies alongside digital versions that are emulator-friendly.  The first title, Circus Convoy, a collaboration between Kitchen and David Crane, went on sale March 13, 2021.

Kitchen is on the Board of Advisors of the National Video Game Museum as well as Fairleigh Dickinson University's FDUArts Advisory Board.

Games

Atari 2600
Space Jockey (1982, US Games)
Donkey Kong (1982, Coleco) arcade port
Keystone Kapers (1983, Activision)
Pressure Cooker (1983, Activision)
Circus Convoy (2021, Audacity Games), with David Crane

Commodore 64
The Designer's Pencil (1984, Activision)
Ghostbusters (1984, Activision), additional programming
Garry Kitchen's Gamemaker (1985, Activision)
Crossbow (1988, Absolute Entertainment), with others, arcade port

Nintendo Entertainment System (NES)
Stealth ATF (1989, Activision), with Rob Harris
A Boy and His Blob: Trouble on Blobolonia (1989, Absolute Entertainment), co-design and programming, with David Crane
Destination Earthstar (1990, Acclaim Entertainment), with Rob Harris
Battletank (1990, Absolute Entertainment)
The Simpsons: Bart vs. the Space Mutants (1991, Acclaim Entertainment), lead design and programming, with others
The Simpsons: Bart vs. the World (1991, Acclaim Entertainment), design and programming, with others

Super Nintendo Entertainment System (SNES)
Home Alone (1991, THQ), design
Super Battletank (1992, Absolute Entertainment)
Super Battletank 2 (1994, Absolute Entertainment), design and additional programming

iOS (iPhone/iPad)
Arcade Hoops Basketball (2008, Skyworks Technologies)
Match 3 Poker (2009, Skyworks Technologies)
Skyscrapers (2009, Skyworks Technologies)
Iron Horse (2010, AppStar Games), Design
Fling Pong - The Planets (2010, AppStar Games)
Addicting Games Mobile (2011, Viacom Media Networks), Executive Producer

References

External links
 
 Garry Kitchen at MobyGames
 Arcade Attack interview
 Retro Gamer Magazine interview
 Retro Video Gamer interview
 Wired Magazine - Garry Kitchen, Designer of Bart vs. The Space Mutants
 Pocketgamer.biz - Skyworks' Garry Kitchen talks iPhone
 IGN - An Audience with David Crane and Garry Kitchen
 Garry Kitchen on Quora

1955 births
Activision
American computer programmers
American video game designers
American video game programmers
Fairleigh Dickinson University alumni
Living people